The 1965–66 NBA season was the Warriors' 20th season in the NBA and 4th in the San Francisco Bay Area.

Offseason

Draft picks

Roster

Regular season

Season standings

Record vs. opponents

Game log

Awards and records
 Nate Thurmond, NBA All-Star Game
 Rick Barry, NBA All-Star Game
 Rick Barry, NBA Rookie of the Year Award
 Rick Barry, All-NBA First Team
 Rick Barry, NBA All-Rookie Team 1st Team
 Fred Hetzel, NBA All-Rookie Team 1st Team

References

Golden State Warriors seasons
San Francisco
San Fran
San Fran